Pavel Vladimirovich Tregubov (born 21 December 1971) is a Russian chess player. He was awarded the title Grandmaster by FIDE in 1994. Tregubov was European champion in 2000.

He is one of the founders of the Association of Chess Professionals (ACP), for which he is currently the ACP Tour director. Tregubov previously served as president, treasurer and board director.

Career
Tregubov won the Corsica Masters tournament in 1997. In 1999 he tied for first place with Simen Agdestein and Mikhail Gurevich in the Cappelle-la-Grande Open. Tregubov won the inaugural European Individual Chess Championship in 2000 in Saint-Vincent scoring 8 points out from 11 games. He is also the winner of the 4th Pivdenny Bank Chess Cup, held in 2008. The following year, Tregubov competed in the FIDE World Cup, from which he was eliminated in the first round after losing to Varuzhan Akobian by 7-9. In October 2011 he tied for 3rd–15th in the open section of the 15th Corsican Circuit.

Tregubov is one of the major practitioners of the Sicilian Taimanov Variation.

Personal life 
In 2015 Pavel Tregubov married Alexandra Kosteniuk.

Together with 43 other Russian elite chess players, Trebugov signed an open letter to Russian president Vladimir Putin, protesting against the 2022 Russian invasion of Ukraine and expressing solidarity with the  Ukrainian people.

Notable games
Pavel Tregubov vs Rustam Kasimdzhanov, FIDE World Ch 2000, Slav Defense: Czech Variation (D17), 1-0
Boris Kantsler vs Pavel Tregubov, EU Clubs Cup 2003, Sicilian Defense: Alapin Variation, Smith-Morra Declined (B22), 0-1
Pavel Tregubov vs Andrew Greet, EU Club Cup 2006, Queen's Indian Defense: Fianchetto, Nimzowitsch Variation (E15), 1-0

References

External links
Pavel V Tregubov games at 365Chess.com

1971 births
Living people
Chess grandmasters
Russian chess players
European Chess Champions
Place of birth missing (living people)
Russian activists against the 2022 Russian invasion of Ukraine